Orazio Giraldi (died 1617) was a Roman Catholic prelate who served as Bishop of Comacchio (1592–1617).

Biography
On 22 April 1592, Orazio Giraldi was appointed during the papacy of Pope Clement VIII as Bishop of Comacchio.
On 24 June 1592, he was consecrated bishop by Giulio Canani, Bishop of Modena, with Giovanni Fontana, Bishop of Ferrara, and Gaspare Silingardi, Bishop Emeritus of Ripatransone, serving as co-consecrators. 
He served as Bishop of Comacchio until his death on 29 January 1617.

References

External links and additional sources
 (for Chronology of Bishops) 
 (for Chronology of Bishops) 

16th-century Italian Roman Catholic bishops
17th-century Italian Roman Catholic bishops
Bishops appointed by Pope Clement VIII
1617 deaths